Ommel is a village on the Danish island of Ærø. The village has a population of 266 (1 January 2022).

References

Villages in Denmark
Ærø